Mehmet Hasan Altan (born 11 January 1953) is a Turkish academic economist, journalist, and author of over 25 books. Describing himself as a "Marxist-liberal", he is the originator of the term "Second Republic", arguing that Turkey needs to reconstitute its republic as a true democracy. He is a strong supporter of the Accession of Turkey to the European Union.

Background
He was born 1953 in Ankara, Turkey to the journalist and writer Çetin Altan as the second of two sons. His brother Ahmet Altan is also a journalist and writer.

Altan studied at the Sorbonne University from 1979 to 1984, completing masters and doctoral degrees in economics.

Career
Altan has worked faculty of economics of the Istanbul University since 1986 becoming an associate professor in 1987 and a full professor in 1993. He was dismissed in the aftermath of the failed coup d'état attempt of 2016 and wasn't re-hired since.

From 1987 to November 2006 he contributed to Sabah, before moving to Star, becoming editor-in-chief. He left Star in January 2012. He has been dismissed from his paper because of government's pressures on media.

Prosecution 
On 10 September 2016, Altan was arrested in the wake of the coup d'état attempt. He was later indicted on charges of attempting to overthrow the constitutional order and acting on behalf of a terrorist organization. The Constitutional Court of Turkey ruled on 11 January 2018 that his rights as a journalist had been violated, but his subsequent application for release was rejected by Istanbul Assize Court. On 16 February 2018 he was sentenced to life in prison. In response to this, on 20 March 2018, the European Court of Human Rights (ECHR) made a ruling that determined that his rights under the European Convention on Human Rights had been violated, namely Article, namely Article 5 § 1 (right to liberty and security) and Article 10 (freedom of expression). He was sentenced to life in prison for terror related charges in February 2018 because the day before the Turkish coup d`état attempt 2016, according to Reuters he said on television: “Whatever the developments were that led to military coups in Turkey, by making the same decisions, Erdogan is paving the same path”. On 27 June 2018 he was released pending trial.

Views 
He is the creator of the term "Second Republic", which advocates for the re-founding of Turkey with democracy. He criticized Robert Spano, the president of the ECHR, for his acceptance of a honorary Doctorate by the Istanbul University form the same people who have dismissed him in 2016.

Publications
 Kanatlı Karınca, Nisan Yayınları 1985
Süperler ve Türkiye, AFA Yayınları 1986
Marks'tan Sevgilerle, Güneş Yayınları 1989
Darbelerin Ekonomisi (1990)
Kapitalizm bu köye uğramadı
Kurtler: Seytan Soyundan Mi?
İkinci Cumhuriyet'in Yol Hikayesi
Puslu Demokrasi : Ergenekon Güncesi
Marksist Liberal
Kent Dindarlığı
Metropolis İslam, Timas Publishing Group.

References

External links
 www.mehmetaltan.com
 'I Want the EU because it has been Transforming Us', interview in Today's Zaman, 13 December 2004
 Intellectual Mehmet Altan says EU derailment will harm Turkish public, interview in Today's Zaman, 10 January 2011

1953 births
Living people
Turkish journalists
Turkish columnists
People from Ankara
Academic staff of Istanbul University
Turkish economists
Sabah (newspaper) people
Turkish people of Crimean Tatar descent